Parnassius inopinatus is a high-altitude butterfly which is found only in Afghanistan and parts of north-western Pakistan. It is a member of the snow Apollo genus (Parnassius) of the swallowtail family, (Papilionidae).

References
 Weiss, J.C., 1999. The Parnassiinae of the world, Part 3. Hillside Books, Canterbury, U.K.
 Wyatt, C., 1975 Description de deux nouvelles races d'Afghanistan de Parnassius (Lep. Papilionidae). Entomops 36: 105-109 (3 figs.).
 Kotzsch, H. ,1940 Parnassius inopinatus, eine überraschende neue Art. Entomologische Zeitschrift 54 (3): 17-21 [figs. 1-6].

External links
Parnassius of the World Photo and range map
Photo and text

Insects of Pakistan
inopinatus
Butterflies described in 1940